Point Blank is the debut album by American Southern rock band Point Blank. Produced by Bill Ham, the album was released in 1976 by Arista Records.

Cover artwork
The cover art consists of double barrel shotgun barrel in the white background with the 3-D Point Blank logo up front.

Track listing
"Free Man" - 5:08 (John O'Daniel, Rusty Burns)
"Moving" - 2:57 (O'Daniel, Kim Davis, Peter Gruen, Philip Petty, Burns)
"Wandering" - 5:19 (O'Daniel, Davis, Gruen, Petty, Burns)
"Bad Bees" - 2:31 (Petty, Burns)
"That's the Law" - 3:41 (O'Daniel, Davis, Gruen, Petty, Burns)
"Lone Star Fool" - 4:19 (O'Daniel, Davis)
"Distance" - 5:12 (O'Daniel, Davis, Gruen, Petty, Burns)
"In This World" - 3:09 (O'Daniel, Davis)

Personnel
Rusty Burns - guitar, slide guitar, vocals
Kim Davis - guitar, vocals
Peter Buzzy Gruen- drums, percussion
John O'Daniel - vocals
Phillip Petty - bass guitar

References

1976 debut albums
Arista Records albums
Point Blank (band) albums
Albums produced by Bill Ham